Shayan Khan is a  US-based  Pakistani actor and film producer. He featured  as the lead actor in Na Band Na Baraati, a 2018 Pakistani romantic comedy film. He both produced and acted in Money Back Guarantee,  a Pakistani film directed by Faisal Qureshi.Buraq Shabbir,Sher Alam,

 Life and career 
Khan  was born in Karachi  but later  migrated to the United States with his family where he eventually started his acting career.Habibah Jamil, Aside from debuting as the lead actor in Na Band Na Baraati, and producing Money Back Guarantee, Khan also featured in the  2021 TV Series movie titled Be Someone''.

References

External links
 
  SHAYAN KHAN OFFICIAL

Living people
American film producers
Pakistani film producers
Pakistani male film actors
Year of birth missing (living people)